Constanza Ossorio (1595–1637) was a Spanish poet and writer. She wrote Huerto del celestial esposo, Exposición a la profecía de Jonás and Exposición de los Psalmos.

Spanish poets
1595 births
1637 deaths
17th-century Spanish women writers